Surface plasmon resonance (SPR) is a phenomenon that occurs where electrons in a thin metal sheet become excited by light that is directed to the sheet with a particular angle of incidence, and then travel parallel to the sheet. Assuming a constant light source wavelength and that the metal sheet is thin, the angle of incidence that triggers SPR is related to the refractive index of the material and even a small change in the refractive index will cause SPR to not be observed. This makes SPR a possible technique for detecting particular substances (analytes) and SPR biosensors have been developed to detect various important biomarkers

Explanation
The surface plasmon polariton is a non-radiative electromagnetic surface wave  that propagates in a direction parallel to the negative permittivity/dielectric material interface. Since the wave is on the boundary of the conductor and the external medium (air, water or vacuum for example), these oscillations are very sensitive to any change of this boundary, such as the adsorption of molecules to the conducting surface.

To describe the existence and properties of surface plasmon polaritons, one can choose from various models (quantum theory, Drude model, etc.). The simplest way to approach the problem is to treat each material as a homogeneous continuum, described by a frequency-dependent relative permittivity between the external medium and the surface. This quantity, hereafter referred to as the materials' "dielectric function", is the complex permittivity. In order for the terms that describe the electronic surface plasmon to exist, the real part of the dielectric constant of the conductor must be negative and its magnitude must be greater than that of the dielectric. This condition is met in the infrared-visible wavelength region for air/metal and water/metal interfaces (where the real dielectric constant of a metal is negative and that of air or water is positive).

LSPRs (localized surface plasmon resonances) are collective electron charge oscillations in metallic nanoparticles that are excited by light. They exhibit enhanced near-field amplitude at the resonance wavelength. This field is highly localized at the nanoparticle and decays rapidly away from the nanoparticle/dielectric interface into the dielectric background, though far-field scattering by the particle is also enhanced by the resonance. Light intensity enhancement is a very important aspect of LSPRs and localization means the LSPR has very high spatial resolution (subwavelength), limited only by the size of nanoparticles. Because of the enhanced field amplitude, effects that depend on the amplitude such as magneto-optical effect are also enhanced by LSPRs.

Implementations

In order to excite surface plasmon polaritons in a resonant manner, one can use electron bombardment or incident light beam (visible and infrared are typical). The incoming beam has to match its momentum to that of the plasmon. In the case of p-polarized light  (polarization occurs parallel to the plane of incidence), this is possible by passing the light through a block of glass to increase the wavenumber (and the momentum), and achieve the resonance at a given wavelength and angle. S-polarized light (polarization occurs perpendicular to the plane of incidence) cannot excite electronic surface plasmons.
Electronic and magnetic surface plasmons obey the following dispersion relation:

Typical metals that support surface plasmons are silver and gold, but metals such as copper, titanium or chromium have also been used.

When using light to excite SP waves, there are two configurations which are well known. In the Otto configuration, the light illuminates the wall of a glass block, typically a prism, and is totally internally reflected. A thin metal film (for example gold) is positioned close enough to the prism wall so that an evanescent wave can interact with the plasma waves on the surface and hence excite the plasmons.

In the Kretschmann configuration (also known as Kretschmann–Raether configuration), the metal film is evaporated onto the glass block. The light again illuminates the glass block, and an evanescent wave penetrates through the metal film. The plasmons are excited at the outer side of the film. This configuration is used in most practical applications.

SPR emission
When the surface plasmon wave interacts with a local particle or irregularity, such as a rough surface, part of the energy can be re-emitted as light. This emitted light can be detected behind the metal film from various directions.

Analytical implementations 
Surface plasmon resonance can be implemented in analytical instrumentation. SPR instruments consist of a light source, an input scheme, a prism with analyte interface, a detector, and computer.

Detectors 
The detectors used in surface plasmon resonance convert the photons of light reflected off the metallic film into an electrical signal. A position sensing detector (PSD) or charged-coupled device (CCD) may be used to operate as detectors.

Applications

Surface plasmons have been used to enhance the surface sensitivity of several spectroscopic measurements including fluorescence, Raman scattering, and second-harmonic generation. However, in their simplest form, SPR reflectivity measurements can be used to detect molecular adsorption, such as polymers, DNA or proteins, etc. Technically, it is common to measure the angle of minimum reflection (angle of maximum absorption). This angle changes in the order of 0.1° during thin (about nm thickness) film adsorption. (See also the Examples.) In other cases the changes in the absorption wavelength is followed. The mechanism of detection is based on that the adsorbing molecules cause changes in the local index of refraction, changing the resonance conditions of the surface plasmon waves. The same principle is exploited in the recently developed competitive platform based on loss-less dielectric multilayers (DBR), supporting surface electromagnetic waves with sharper resonances (Bloch surface waves).

If the surface is patterned with different biopolymers, using adequate optics and imaging sensors (i.e. a camera), the technique can be extended to surface plasmon resonance imaging (SPRI). This method provides a high contrast of the images based on the adsorbed amount of molecules, somewhat similar to Brewster angle microscopy (this latter is most commonly used together with a Langmuir–Blodgett trough).

For nanoparticles, localized surface plasmon oscillations can give rise to the intense colors of suspensions or sols containing the nanoparticles. Nanoparticles or nanowires of noble metals exhibit strong absorption bands in the ultraviolet–visible light regime that are not present in the bulk metal. This extraordinary absorption increase has been exploited to increase light absorption in photovoltaic cells by depositing metal nanoparticles on the cell surface. The energy (color) of this absorption differs when the light is polarized along or perpendicular to the nanowire. Shifts in this resonance due to changes in the local index of refraction upon adsorption to the nanoparticles can also be used to detect biopolymers such as DNA or proteins. 
Related complementary techniques include plasmon waveguide resonance, QCM, extraordinary optical transmission, and dual-polarization interferometry.

SPR immunoassay 
The first SPR immunoassay was proposed in 1983 by Liedberg, Nylander, and Lundström, then of the Linköping Institute of Technology (Sweden).  They adsorbed
human IgG onto a 600-Ångström silver film, and used the assay to detect anti-human IgG in water solution.  Unlike many other immunoassays, such as ELISA, an SPR immunoassay is label free in that a label molecule is not required for detection of the analyte. Additionally, the measurements on SPR can be followed real-time allowing the monitoring of individual steps in sequential binding events particularly useful in the assessment of for instance sandwich complexes.

Material characterization
Multi-parametric surface plasmon resonance, a special configuration of SPR, can be used to characterize layers and stacks of layers. Besides binding kinetics, MP-SPR can also provide information on structural changes in terms of layer true thickness and refractive index. MP-SPR has been applied successfully in measurements of lipid targeting and rupture, CVD-deposited single monolayer of graphene (3.7Å) as well as micrometer thick polymers.

Data interpretation
The most common data interpretation is based on the Fresnel formulas, which treat the formed thin films as infinite, continuous dielectric layers. This interpretation may result in multiple possible refractive index and thickness values. However, usually only one solution is within the reasonable data range. In multi-parametric surface plasmon resonance, two SPR curves are acquired by scanning a range of angles at two different wavelengths, which results in a unique solution for both thickness and refractive index.

Metal particle plasmons are usually modeled using the Mie scattering theory.

In many cases no detailed models are applied, but the sensors are calibrated for the specific application, and used with interpolation within the calibration curve.

Novel applications 
Due to the versatility of SPR instrumentation, this technique pairs well with other approaches, leading to novel applications in various fields, such as biomedical and environmental studies. 

When coupled with nanotechnology, SPR biosensors can use nanoparticles as carriers for therapeutic implants. For instance, in the treatment of Alzheimer's disease, nanoparticles can be used to deliver therapeutic molecules in targeted ways. In general, SPR biosensing is demonstrating advantages over other approaches in the biomedical field due to this technique being label-free, lower in costs, applicable in point-of-care settings, and capable of producing faster results for smaller research cohorts. 

In the study of environmental pollutants, SPR instrumentation can be used as a replacement for former chromatography-based techniques. Current pollution research relies on chromatography to monitor increases in pollution in an ecosystem over time. When SPR instrumentation with a Kretschmann prism configuration was used in the detection of chlorophene, an emerging pollutant, it was demonstrated that SPR has similar precision and accuracy levels as chromatography techniques. Furthermore, SPR sensing surpasses chromatography techniques through its high-speed, straightforward analysis.

Examples

Layer-by-layer self-assembly

One of the first common applications of surface plasmon resonance spectroscopy was the measurement of the thickness (and refractive index) of adsorbed self-assembled nanofilms on gold substrates. The resonance curves shift to higher angles as the thickness of the adsorbed film increases. This example is a 'static SPR' measurement.

When higher speed observation is desired, one can select an angle right below
the resonance point (the angle of minimum reflectance), and measure the reflectivity changes at that point.
This is the so-called 'dynamic SPR' measurement. The interpretation of the data assumes that the structure of the film does not change significantly during the measurement.

Binding constant determination

When the affinity of two ligands has to be determined, the equilibrium dissociation constant must be determined. It is the equilibrium value for the product quotient. This value can also be found using the dynamic SPR parameters and, as in any chemical reaction, it is the dissociation rate divided by the association rate.

For this, a bait ligand is immobilized on the dextran surface of the SPR crystal. Through a microflow system, a solution with the prey analyte is injected over the bait layer. As the prey analyte binds the bait ligand, an increase in SPR signal (expressed in response units, RU) is observed. After desired association time, a solution without the prey analyte (usually the buffer) is injected on the microfluidics that dissociates the bound complex between bait ligand and prey analyte. Now as the prey analyte dissociates from the bait ligand, a decrease in SPR signal (expressed in resonance units, RU) is observed. From these association ('on rate') and dissociation rates ('off rate'), the equilibrium dissociation constant ('binding constant') can be calculated.

The actual SPR signal can be explained by the electromagnetic 'coupling' of the incident light with the surface plasmon of the gold layer. This plasmon can be influenced by the layer just a few nanometer across the gold–solution interface i.e. the bait protein and possibly the prey protein. Binding makes the reflection angle change;

Thermodynamic analysis
As SPR biosensors facilitate measurements at different temperatures, thermodynamic analysis can be performed
to obtain a better understanding of the studied interaction. By performing measurements at different temperatures,
typically between 4 and 40 °C, it is possible to relate association and dissociation rate constants with activation
energy and thereby obtain thermodynamic parameters including binding enthalpy, binding entropy,
Gibbs free energy and heat capacity.

Pair-wise epitope mapping
As SPR allows real-time monitoring, individual steps in sequential binding events can be thoroughly assessed when investigating the suitability between antibodies in a sandwich configuration. Additionally, it allows the mapping of epitopes as antibodies of overlapping epitopes will be associated with an attenuated signal compared to those capable of interacting simultaneously.

Magnetic plasmon resonance
Recently, there has been an interest in magnetic surface plasmons. These require materials with large negative magnetic permeability, a property that has only recently been made available with the construction of metamaterials.

See also 
Hydrogen sensor
Multi-parametric surface plasmon resonance
Nano-optics
Plasmon
Spinplasmonics
Surface plasmon polariton
Waves in plasmas
Localized surface plasmon
Quartz crystal microbalance

References

Further reading 

A selection of free-download papers on Plasmonics in New Journal of Physics

 
 

Electromagnetism
Nanotechnology
Spectroscopy
Biochemistry methods
Biophysics
Forensic techniques
Protein–protein interaction assays
Plasmonics
Optical phenomena